Evelyn Ida Morris, also known as Pikelet, is a musician from the outer suburbs of Melbourne, Australia. Morris does not identify as either male or female and prefers to use "they", "them" and "their" as pronouns.

They released four albums; Pikelet (2007), Stem (2010), Calluses (2013) and Tronc (2016).

Career
Morris began playing piano from a young age.

Their music career began as a hardcore/punk-obsessed drummer, performing in many bands but mostly including Baseball and True Radical Miracle.

In 2003 Morris switched from drum kit to a mix of instruments and a loop pedal for recordings as Pikelet. The project employs delay pedals, piano accordion, guitar, drums, and other forms of percussion.

The name "Pikelet" comes from Evelyn's mother, who used to spoil her kids with pikelets (Australian pancake) when she was a little short of money. "She always had eggs, she always had flour and powdered milk in the cupboard, so she would just throw together pikelets", Evelyn told Mess+Noise in 2007. "It was a really big deal for me, but I found out later that it was just what she did when she had nothing else".

Pikelet released their self-titled album in 2007. They have toured throughout Australia, Europe and New Zealand playing with acts including Frida Hyvönen, Jens Lekman, Beirut, Camera Obscura, Darren Hanlon, The Blow, Sufjan Stevens, Broadcast and Ned Collette.

From 2010 Pikelet has frequently referred to a band consisting of Morris, Shags Chamberlain, Tarquin Manek and Matthew Cox. Later releases have been described as "deep psych pop", and songs have been written collaboratively.

In April 2018, Morris issued a predominantly wordless, piano-based self-titled album.

In August 2018, Morris provided the score for the Australian film Acute Misfortune, an adaptation of the biography of Adam Cullen by Erik Jensen, directed by Thomas M. Wright.

On 18 March 2019, Morris released the final Pikelet released, the EP Goodbye.

Discography

Studio albums

Soundtracks

Extended plays

Awards and nominations

ARIA Music Awards
The ARIA Music Awards is an annual awards ceremony that recognises excellence, innovation, and achievement across all genres of Australian music. They commenced in 1987. 

! 
|-
| 2018
| Acute Misfortune (Original Soundtrack)
| Best Original Soundtrack, Cast or Show Album
| 
|rowspan="2" | 
|-

Australian Music Prize
The Australian Music Prize (the AMP) is an annual award of $30,000 given to an Australian band or solo artist in recognition of the merit of an album released during the year of award. The commenced in 2005.

|-
| 2010
|Stem
| Australian Music Prize
| 
|-

Music Victoria Awards
The Music Victoria Awards are an annual awards night celebrating Victorian music. They commenced in 2006.

! 
|-
| Music Victoria Awards of 2013
| Evelyn Morris
| Best Female
| 
|rowspan="2"| 
|-
| Music Victoria Awards of 2014
| Evelyn Morris
| Best Experimental/Avant-Garde Act
| 
|-
| 2022 Music Victoria Awards
| Evelyn Morris
| Arts Access Amplify Award (for Deaf and Disabled acts)
| 
| 
|-

National Live Music Awards
The National Live Music Awards (NLMAs) are a broad recognition of Australia's diverse live industry, celebrating the success of the Australian live scene. The awards commenced in 2016.

|-
| National Live Music Awards of 2016
| themselves 
| Industry Achievement
| 
|-

References

Australian musicians
Non-binary musicians
Musicians from Melbourne
Living people
Place of birth missing (living people)
Year of birth missing (living people)